Khachik Dashtents (Khachik Tonoyi Tonoyan, May 25, 1910 – March 9, 1974) was an ethnic Armenian Soviet writer, poet and translator.

Biography 
Khachik Dashtents was born in a shepherd's family on May 25, 1910 in Dashtadem, Sasun, Western Armenia (Turkey today).

After the Armenian genocide, he moved to Yerevan and graduated from the Yerevan State University in 1932, and later studied at the Moscow State Linguistic University (graduating in 1940).

In 1934 he became a member of the Union of Soviet Writers.

Dashtents is an author of poetry collections ("Songbook", 1932; "Spring Songs", 1934; "Fire", 1936), "Tigran The Great," a historical drama (1947), translations from William Shakespeare, Henry Wadsworth Longfellow and William Saroyan. The "Khodedan" (1950) and "Call of Plowmen" (published posthumously, in 1979) novels tell the tragic story of Western Armenians during World War I.

He is the father of filmmaker Tavros Dashtents.

He died in Yerevan, Armenia on March 9, 1974.

References

External links
Khachik Dashtents Blog
ԽԱՉԻԿ ԴԱՇՏԵՆՑ
Dashtents at Armenianhouse

1910 births
1974 deaths
Soviet Armenians
Emigrants from the Ottoman Empire to the Russian Empire
Ethnic Armenian poets
Ethnic Armenian translators
Yerevan State University alumni
Armenians from the Ottoman Empire
20th-century translators
20th-century poets
20th-century Armenian writers
20th-century Armenian poets